Love Wars is the 1983 debut album by musical duo Womack & Womack. The album, described by Chris Rizik of SoulTracks as "a critical favorite", charted at number 34 on the Billboard Top R&B/Hip-Hop Albums chart. In his review of the album, music critic Robert Christgau praised husband Cecil Womack and wife Linda Womack as "[a]ce singers and songwriters (as opposed to singer-songwriters)", noting that "their lyrics about loss and conflict are sharper than those about love and happiness".

Two singles from the album, "Love Wars" and "Baby I'm Scared of You", were hits in the UK, reaching number 14 and number 72 on the UK Singles Chart, respectively. The album was ranked number 4 among the "Albums of the Year" for 1984 by NME, and the single "Love Wars" was ranked as the year's number 1 song.

Track listing
Except where otherwise noted, all tracks by Cecil Womack and Linda Womack.

"Love Wars" - 5:58
"Express Myself" – 4:52
"Baby I'm Scared of You" (Eddie Noble, Jr., C. Womack, L. Womack) – 5:38
"T.K.O." (Noble, C. Womack, L. Womack) – 4:14
"A.P.B." (C. Womack, Friendly Womack, L. Womack) – 5:31
"Catch and Don't Look Back" (C. Womack, L. Womack, Naomi Womack) – 5:26
"Woman" – 4:17
"Angie" (Mick Jagger, Keith Richards) – 2:55
"Good Times" – 3:06

Personnel

Musicians

Lenny Castro – percussion
Paulinho Da Costa – percussion
Nathan East – bass
James Gadson – drums
Abraham Laboriel – bass
Neil Larsen – synthesizer, guitar, piano
Denzil Miller – keyboard
Eddie "Gip" Noble – synthesizer
Bobby Womack – background vocals
Cecil Womack – bass, guitar, vocals
Curtis Womack – vocals, background vocals 
Friendly Womack, Jr. – background vocals
Linda Womack – vocals, background vocals
Naomi Womack – background vocals
Noel "Stacy" Womack – background vocals
Art Wood – electronic drums

Production
Bob Defrin – art direction
Mark Ettel – assistant engineer
Bernie Grundman – mastering
Michael Kennedy – photography
Stewart Levine – producer
Rik Pekkonen – engineer, mixing

Charts 
Album

Singles

References

Womack & Womack albums
1983 debut albums
Albums produced by Stewart Levine
Elektra Records albums